Henning Clausen (born 16 October 1939) is a Danish former sport shooter who competed in the 1972 Summer Olympics, in the 1976 Summer Olympics and in the 1980 Summer Olympics.

References

1939 births
Living people
Danish male sport shooters
ISSF rifle shooters
Olympic shooters of Denmark
Shooters at the 1972 Summer Olympics
Shooters at the 1976 Summer Olympics
Shooters at the 1980 Summer Olympics
20th-century Danish people